The videography of Santana, a Mexican-American rock guitarist, and his band Santana currently consists of 10 concert tour videos, 13 video singles and 1 box set.

Over a career spanning forty years, Santana has been seen as exemplifying latin rock, whilst diversifying into other genres. Santana sold in the following years more than 100 million album copies to date. His best-selling album so far is Supernatural, which sold over 27 million copies worldwide. Rolling Stone named Santana number 15 on their list of the 100 Greatest Guitarists of All Time in 2003. He has won 10 Grammy Awards and 3 Latin Grammy Awards.

Videos

Video singles

Concert tour videos

Box sets

Video singles certifications

Concert tour videos certifications

Box sets certifications

Guest Appearances

References

Videography
Videographies of American artists